Rheinwald is a municipality in the Viamala Region in the Swiss canton of Graubünden. On 1 January 2019 the former municipalities of Hinterrhein, Nufenen and Splügen merged to form the new municipality of Rheinwald.

History

Hinterrhein
Hinterrhein is first mentioned in 1219 as de Reno.

Nufenen
Nufenen was first mentioned in 1343 as Ovena.  In 1633 it was mentioned as Nufena.  In Romansh it was known as Nueinas and it used to be known as Novena in Italian.

Splügen
Splügen is first mentioned about 840 as cella in Speluca.

Geography

Demographics

Historic Population
The historical population is given in the following chart:

Heritage sites of national significance

The Alte Landbrücke (Old Bridge) and the Säumerherberge (mule drivers hostel) Weiss Kreuz are listed as Swiss heritage sites of national significance.

Wakker Prize
In 1995, the Swiss Heritage Society bestowed the Wakker Prize on the village of Splügen.  The prize description notes that Splügen had reached a notable compromise between preservation and tourism.  The old town was strictly protected to maintain the original appearance, while rational zone planning allowed development to occur outside the old village.

Climate
Between 1961 and 1990 Hinterrhein had an average of 121.4 days of rain per year and on average received  of precipitation. During this month there was precipitation for an average of 14.2 days.

References

External links

 
Municipalities of Graubünden
Cultural property of national significance in Graubünden